Reimarla (Finnish), Reimars (Swedish) is a western neighborhood of Helsinki, Finland.

Pitäjänmäki